The Acadian Deputy was a position in 18th-century Nova Scotia, Canada, created by the Nova Scotia Council to represent the interests of an Acadian community to the Council.

Function 
The deputy was more than simply a spokesperson for the community. Sometimes the duty of collecting quit-rents fell to the deputy. The deputies were much like justices of the peace and, like the justices of the peace, drew much of their authority form the willingness of the community to accept that authority.

The number in 1720 started at six, elected in the Annapolis Royal region in 1720, to 24 by the end of the decade: four each for Minas, Pisique, Cobequid.

12 April 1721, on the representation of Charles Robicheau, deputy of Cobequid, the number of deputies from that district was increased from one to four, (one only being required to attend on the governor.) At the same time the number of deputies from Mines was increased from three to twelve, (three only of them being bound to attend on the governor.) These deputies were to be annually chosen by the inhabitants, subject to the governor's approval. Their duties were to receive and put in execution the orders of the governor, and to report the names of persons disobedient. Their expenses in coming and going were to be defrayed by the inhabitants.

For greater detail of the role of the Acadian Deputy under British rule see Acadia: Governance under the British after 1710.

Major Decisions

Refuse Unconditional Oath (1727)
Charles Landry (born 1686) of Annapolis River married Catherine Brossard at Port Royal on the 29 October 1708. Arsenault lists 8 girls & 2 boys, the boys being: Charles (born 1710) & Francois (born 1716). Charles Landry was one of the four deputies of the Annapolis River region, chosen by the Acadians and approved by the English, in May, 1720; "whose duties it should be to promulgate the orders and proclamations of the government, and to see that their [English] directions were carried into execution." In September, 1727, Charles (with Abraham Bourg, Francis Richards, and Guillaum Bourgeois) was tossed into prison and "laid in irons" for refusing to take the oath. A "Charles Landry" shows up on the Oath of Allegiance signed by 600+ Acadians from "Mines, Cobequit, Piziquid & Beaubassin" in April, 1730.

Refuse Unconditional Oath (1749) 

The first act of Cornwallis' Government, after the organization of the Council on 14 July 1749, was an audience of the three French Deputies, who had come down to meet the New Governor. They were Jean Melanson, from Canard River; Claude LeBlanc, from Grand Pré, and Philip Melanson from Pisiquid.

On 29 July, o. s., (9 August, n. s.), 1749, the following deputies from the French districts arrived at Halifax, viz't. : Alexandre Hebert. j from Annapolis. Joseph Dugas and Claude LeBlanc, from Grand Pré; Jean Melançon, from Riviere des Canards; Baptiste Gaillard, Pierre Landry, Pierre Gotrot, from Cobequid; Pierre Doucet from Chignecto; François Bourg and Alexandre Brossart, Chipodie.

In March 1750, Gerard, the priest of Cobequid, (now Truro), and the four deputies of that district, viz't., Jean Hebert, Jean Bourg, Joseph Robichaux, and Pierre Gautrot, were examined by the governor and council, as to the stopping of the courier Pierre au Coin, who carried the governor's letters — as to de Loutre's having been there that winter, and the non-attendance of the deputies at Halifax, on which Bourg
was liberated, but the rest detained.

Acadian Exodus (1750) 

In April 1750 the French deputies, viz't. : Jacques Teriot, of Grand Pré, Frangois Granger, of Riviere de Canard, Baptiste Galerne and Jean Andre, of Piziquid, petitioned, on behalf of the French inhabitants, for
leave to evacuate the province, and to carry off their effects.

Accept Unconditional Oath (1759) 
16 November 1759, Alexandre Brussard, Simon Martin, Jean Bass and Joseph Brussard, came with a flag of truce to fort Cumberland, (Beausejour), as deputies for about 190 French Acadians — men,
women and children, residing at Petitcoudiac and Memramcook.

17 November 1759, Pierre Sufetz, Jean Burk and Michel Burk, arrived at the Fort Cumberland, under flag of truce, as deputies for 700 persons resident at Miramichi, Richibucto and Buctouche.

Deputies 

In 1725, Charles Landry was a deputy.

In 1727, three deputies were Abraham Bourg, Charles Landry & Guillaume Bourgois.

In 1732, Nicholas Gautier, one of the deputes.

In 1736 Joseph Godin and his brother-in-law, Michel Bergeron d’Amboise, went as deputies from the Saint John Acadians to the Annapolis Royal Council.

In 1742, the two deputies of Grand Pré were Bujean and Bourg.

In 1745, Louis Robichaux (Robichau, Robeshaw) was a deputy for Annapolis.

In 1745, Jean Terriot and Jean Potier were deputies from Chignecto.

In 1748, the deputies in Piziquid were Abraham Landry and Jean Chienne;  in Grand Pré there was Bern. Diagre, Mich'l LeBlanc, Fras. Boudrot and Paul Oquine; in River Canard there was John Terroit, Oliver Deglass, Jean Granger and Michael Richard.

In 1748, On the 18 October, o. s., the old and new deputies of Grand Pré presented themselves, before the governor and council at Annapolis. They had divided Grand Pré into districts, which was approved of; but as they had elected Martin au Coin, whose brother Paul was a known opponent of the government, and he suspected, the choice was annulled, and they were ordered to elect another in his place.

References

External links 
 T.B. Akins. The First Council. Collections of the Nova Scotia Historical Society, Volume 2, pp. 17-30
 Minutes of the Nova Scotia Council
  THE FOUNDING OF HALIFAX IN 1749 BY ARTHUR WENTWORTH HAMILTON EATON
 Volume 1

Political history of Nova Scotia
Acadian history